The  is an  cable stayed bridge in Yokohama, Japan. Opened September 27, 1989, it crosses Tokyo Bay with a span of 460 metres (1,510 feet). The toll is ¥600. The bridge is part of the Bayshore Route of the Shuto Expressway.

Notes

External links

Naka-ku, Yokohama
Bridges completed in 1989
Cable-stayed bridges in Japan
Buildings and structures in Yokohama
Toll bridges in Japan
1989 establishments in Japan
Transport in Yokohama
Double-decker bridges